The Corrie Folk Trio and Paddie Bell is the eponymous 1964 album by The Corrie Folk Trio and Paddie Bell.

Musical style
The most vigorous song on this album is "Greenland Fisheries" with Ronnie Browne shouting "There She Blows" at the start of the song, at the top of his voice. "Jock O' Braidislee" is sung unaccompanied by Ronnie Browne. Paddie Bell sings "Lord Gregory" with only her banjo for accompaniment. The album begins with four songs associated with the game of two balls and a wall.

Track listing 
The Singing Games. (a) The Windy City (I'll Tell Me Ma) (b) Call on the one you love (c) 1 2 3 O'Leary (d) I'm No Goin' Tae Barry's Trip
Lock The Door, Lariston
Jock o' Braidislee (solo by Ronnie Browne)
Doodle Let Me Go (Yellow Girls) (vocal by Paddie Bell)
The Lass O' Fyvie
The Itinerant Cobbler
Lord Gregory (vocal by Paddie Bell) [Child Ballad 76]
McPherson's Farewell
Coorie Doon (vocal by Paddie Bell)(written by Matt McGinn)
Greenland Fisheries

Note: The 2002 CD re-release included their entire second album The Promise of the Day as tracks 11 - 24.

Personnel 
Roy Williamson – vocals, concertina
Ronnie Browne – vocals
Bill Smith – vocals, guitar
Paddie Bell – vocals, banjo
Robin Brock – acoustic bass (track 8)

Note: Acoustic guitars, mandolin, and bandurría are also heard but no credits are given.

External links
The Corries Official Website
theBalladeers Scotland
Interview with Bill Smith

The Corries albums